Book café is a book-themed café and also may refer to:
Ivar Matlaus Book Café
The Book Café (Zimbabwe), a platform for free cultural expression, winner of a Prins Claus Prize in 2011